Zouhair Ahmad Abdallah (born 5 May 1983) is a Lebanese footballer who plays as a defender and captains  club Shabab Sahel. Starting out as a right-back, Abdallah moved to centre-back later on in his career.

Abdallah started his senior career at Shabab Sahel in 2004, helping them win the Lebanese Challenge Cup twice in a row (2014 and 2015). In 2017–18 Abdallah helped his side win the Lebanese Second Division, gaining promotion back to the Lebanese Premier League. In 2019, Abdallah helped Shabab Sahel win their first Lebanese Elite Cup.

Abdallah played twice for the Lebanon national team, both times in 2011: a friendly against Oman, and a 2014 World Cup qualifier against Bangladesh.

Club career 
Abdallah began his senior career with Shabab Sahel in 2004. He helped his team win two Lebanese Challenge Cups in a row (2014 and 2015). 

Following six seasons in the Lebanese top division, Shabab Sahel were relegated to the Lebanese Second Division. In 2017–18 Abdallah helped Shabab Sahel win the Lebanese Second Division, and gain promotion back to the Premier League. In the summer prior to the 2019–20 season, Abdallah helped Shabab Sahel win their first Lebanese Elite Cup.

International career 
Abdallah made his senior international debut for Lebanon on 9 July 2011, in a friendly game against Oman; the match ended in a 1–0 home defeat. Abdallah's second, and final, game for Lebanon came on 28 July 2011, in a 2–0 defeat to Bangladesh in a 2014 FIFA World Cup qualifier match.

Honours 
Shabab Sahel
 Lebanese Elite Cup: 2019
 Lebanese Challenge Cup: 2014, 2015
 Lebanese Second Division: 2005–06, 2017–18
 Lebanese FA Cup runner-up: 2008–09, 2012–13
 Lebanese Super Cup runner-up: 2013

References

External links

 
 
 
 
 

1983 births
Living people
People from Bint Jbeil District
Lebanese footballers
Association football defenders
Lebanese Premier League players
Lebanese Second Division players
Shabab Al Sahel FC players
Lebanon international footballers